Albert Konstantin Ingman (11 March 1871, in Helsingin maalaiskunta – 28 December 1948) was a Finnish house painter and politician. He was a member of the Parliament of Finland from 1907 to 1908, representing the Social Democratic Party of Finland (SDP).

References

1871 births
1948 deaths
People from Vantaa
People from Uusimaa Province (Grand Duchy of Finland)
Swedish-speaking Finns
Social Democratic Party of Finland politicians
Members of the Parliament of Finland (1907–08)